Nowy Dzików  (Novyi Dykiv) is a village in the administrative district of Gmina Stary Dzików, within Lubaczów County, Subcarpathian Voivodeship, in south-eastern Poland.

References

Villages in Lubaczów County